Glycomyces rhizosphaerae is a bacterium from the genus of Glycomyces which has been isolated from rhizospheric soil of a soybean plant from Harbin in China.

References 

Actinomycetia
Bacteria described in 2018